A Look at Monaco is a 1963 soundtrack album by Percy Faith and performed by the Orchestre National de l'Opera de Monte Carlo for the CBS television special and documentary A Look at Monaco. The film featured a tour of the principal sites of Monaco conducted by the former American actress Grace Kelly, who had become the Princess Consort of Monaco following her 1956 marriage to Rainier III, Prince of Monaco. 

Grace's narration from the film is featured on the album.

Track listing
 "Prelude (Fireworks and the Faces of Monaco)" - 1:46
 "Monaco" - 2:12
 "The Old Palace" - 3:04
 "The Children" - 1:26
 "The Courtyard" - 0:53
 "In the Palace (The Clock, The Painting, The Mirror, The Throne)" - 1:53
 "Outdoors" - 2:45
 "The Zoo (Elephant, Lions, Leopard, Chimp)" - 4:02
 "The Museum" - 1:18
 "Water Sports (The Boat Ride)" - 4:03
 "National Holiday, March and the Opera House" - 4:06
 "National Anthem" - 1:15
 "Farewell" - 2:27

Personnel
Princess Grace of Monaco - narration
Percy Faith - arranger
Orchestre National de l'Opera de Monte Carlo

References

1963 soundtrack albums
Columbia Records soundtracks
Cultural depictions of Grace Kelly
Percy Faith albums
Monegasque culture